The 1911 Cincinnati football team was an American football team that represented the University of Cincinnati as a member of the Ohio Athletic Conference during the 1911 college football season. In their third and final season under head coach Robert Burch, the team compiled a 6–2–1 record (2–1–1 against conference opponents). Walter Heuck was the team captain. The team played its home games at Carson Field in Cincinnati.

Schedule

References

Cincinnati
Cincinnati Bearcats football seasons
Cincinnati football